Genki Koga (born 19 December 1998) is a Japanese judoka.

He is the gold medallist of the 2019 Asian-Pacific Judo Championships in the -60 kg category.

References

External links
 

1998 births
Living people
Japanese male judoka
21st-century Japanese people